Pseudostyphlus is a genus of beetles belonging to the family Curculionidae.

The species of this genus are found in Europe.

Species:
 Pseudostyphlus bilunulatus Desbrochers, 1892 
 Pseudostyphlus dorytomiformis Pic, 1913

References

Curculionidae
Curculionidae genera